Singles is a British sitcom set in a singles bar produced by Yorkshire Television (a pilot episode having been produced by Thames Television in 1984). It aired for three series and 22 episodes on the ITV network between 1988 and 1991. Main character Malcolm, played by Roger Rees, was written out in the final series after Rees relocated to the United States with Simon Cadell joining the cast in his place as Dennis Duval.

Cast
Pilot (Thames):
Patricia Brake as Di
Jane Carr as Jackie
John Kavanagh as Clive 
Robin Nedwell as Malcolm
Angela Richards as Pamela

TV series (Yorkshire):
Susie Blake as Jackie
Eamon Boland as Clive
Simon Cadell as Dennis Duval
Judy Loe as Pamela
Gina Maher as Di
Roger Rees as Malcolm

Episodes

Pilot
"Singles' Night" (19 June 1984)

Series 1
"Encounter" (27 January 1988)
"Foursome" (3 February 1988)
"Yesterday" (10 February 1988)
"Money, Money, Money" (17 February 1988)
"Some Enchanted Evening" (24 February 1988)
"The Gentle Art" (2 March 1988)
"False Pretences" (9 March 1988)

Series 2
"Serenade" (23 January 1989)
"The Charmer" (30 January 1989)
"Old Flames" (6 February 1989)
"Dangerous Moonlight" (13 February 1989)
"Sons and Lovers" (20 February 1989)
"Family Likeness" (27 February 1989)
"Cold Feet" (6 March 1989)

Series 3
"Fourth Time Lucky for Dennis Duval?" (10 July 1991)
"Don't Look Now!" (17 July 1991)
"Blind Date" (24 July 1991)
"Name Dropper" (31 July 1991)
"Flash Back" (7 August 1991)
"The Loser" (14 August 1991)
"To Russia with Love" (21 August 1991)

External links
 .

1984 British television series debuts
1991 British television series endings
1980s British sitcoms
1990s British sitcoms
ITV sitcoms
Television series by Fremantle (company)
Television series by ITV Studios
Television series by Yorkshire Television
Television shows produced by Thames Television
English-language television shows